SACE SIMEST is the Italian export credit agency. It is wholly-owned by Cassa Depositi e Prestiti and governed by Rodolfo Errore and Pierfrancesco Latini.

History
 1977 - establishment of Sezione speciale per l'Assicurazione del Credito all'Esportazione - SACE as public entity under the surveillance of the Italian Ministry of the Treasury
 1990 - establishment of Società Italiana per le Imprese Miste all'Estero - SIMEST as public entity under the surveillance of the Italian Ministry of Foreign Trade
 1998 - Sezione speciale per l'Assicurazione del Credito all'Esportazione - SACE was transformed into Istituto per i Servizi Assicurativi del Commercio Estero - SACE as an entity with legal personality under public law, under the supervision of the Ministry of the Treasury, Budget and Economic Planning
 2004 - SACE is transformed into a joint-stock company, whose capital is wholly-owned by Ministry of Economy and Finance and enters the short-term credit insurance market 
 2005 - SACE enters the surety market
 2010 - SACE enters the factoring market
 2012 - SACE is acquired by Cassa Depositi e Prestiti
 2016 - SACE and SIMEST constitute a hub for exports and internationalization with their One-door initiative
 2017 - establishment of SACE SIMEST

Activity
SACE SIMEST, 100% controlled by Cassa Depositi e Prestiti, offers a complex range of instruments for credit insurance, investment protection, the provision of sureties and financial guarantees.
The credit insurance is the reduction or transfer to third parties of the risks of insolvency. The insurance includes, from an economic-financial, managing and funding the loan.
The risks of construction are all factors capable of damaging a particular company or that she herself may be damaged.

See also 
 Cassa Depositi e Prestiti

References

External links 
 

Export credit agencies
Government-owned companies of Italy